The T. L. Thorpe Building was an historic commercial building located at 19 Traction Street in Manchester, New Hampshire. It was added to the National Register of Historic Places (NRHP) in 1982.

The building was constructed circa 1881 and was named for Thomas L. Thorpe, a prominent textile merchant, who maintained an office upstairs. The first floor was occupied by a produce dealer. Photographs of the building, which was razed in 1982, were taken by the Historic American Buildings Survey around 1933.

The property was removed from the NRHP in 1999.

See also
 National Register of Historic Places listings in Hillsborough County, New Hampshire

References

Former National Register of Historic Places in New Hampshire
Buildings and structures in Manchester, New Hampshire
Commercial buildings completed in 1881
Demolished buildings and structures in New Hampshire
Buildings and structures demolished in 1982